The Iron Mistress is a 1952 American Western film directed by Gordon Douglas and starring Alan Ladd and Virginia Mayo. It ends with Bowie's marriage to Ursula de Veramendi and does not deal with his death at the Battle of the Alamo in 1836.

It was the first film Ladd made at Warner Bros. after spending a decade at Paramount Pictures.

Plot

In the early 19th century, Jim Bowie leaves his home in the Louisiana bayou to sell lumber in New Orleans. He inadvertently offends Narcisse de Bornay by defending the future famous artist James Audubon and is challenged to a duel, but charms his way out of it, and Narcisse becomes his friend.

Narcisse notices that his sister Judalon has caught Jim's eye and is concerned, knowing how haughty and spoiled she is. Henri Contrecourt, a man who has been courting her, kills Narcisse and challenges Jim to a fight, his sword versus Bowie's knife. To the surprise of everyone, Jim kills him. When Judalon declines Jim's marriage proposal, he returns home and grows wealthy from the cotton business, upsetting Juan Moreno, a wealthy Mississippi cotton grower.

Later, Jim enters a horse in a race in which there is heavy betting. At the race, Jim learns that Judalon has married wealthy Philippe de Cabanal, someone of her own elite social class. (Privately, Judalon says she plans to obtain a divorce, a difficult undertaking at the time.) Moreno's steed comes a close second, and he and other losing bettors seek to have Jim's horse disqualified, claiming he does not own it. Jim produces a bill of sale, but has to travel to Nashville to have the signature of the previous owner verified. On the way, Bowie ask a renowned blacksmith to create a special new knife for him; the blacksmith is intrigued by the challenge and uses the remains of a meteorite to help strengthen the blade.

Jim learns that Judalon has been seeing Moreno. When the last of the losing bettors pay up, he insults Jim's friend, causing a duel to which Jima and Moreno are opposing seconds. When the duel ends after the participants miss each other twice, Moreno shoots one man and stabs Jim with his sword; Jim kills Moreno with his new knife. Afterward, Judalon tells Jim that she was cultivating Moreno because he had the political influence to obtain a bill of divorcement for her. She remains with Phillipe.

Jim is seriously wounded while traveling to Texas. He is nursed back to health by Ursula Veramendi, daughter of the Governor of the Texas province of adjacent Mexico.

When he returns to New Orleans to wrap up his affairs, he encounters Judalon and Phillippe aboard a luxurious steamboat. Phillippe has lost his money playing against card sharps. Jim exposes one of the cheaters and returns Philippe's money to him. Judalon then tells Philippe that she is leaving him for Jim. Both Philippe and Bloody Jack Sturdevant come to kill Jim and unintentionally murder each other instead. When Judalon shows no regret at all for her husband's death, Jim abandons her, throws his knife into the river and marries Ursula.

Cast

 Alan Ladd as Jim Bowie
 Virginia Mayo as Judalon de Bornay
 Joseph Calleia as Juan Moreno
 Phyllis Kirk as Ursula Veramendi
 Alf Kjellin as Philippe de Cabanal
 Douglas Dick as Narcisse de Bornay
 Anthony Caruso as Bloody Jack Sturdevant (credited as "Tony Caruso")
 Nedrick Young as Henri Contrecourt (credited as "Ned Young")
 George Voskovec as John James Audubon
 Richard Carlyle as Rezin Bowie
 Robert Emhardt as Gen. Cuny
 Don Beddoe as Dr. Cuny (credited as "Donald Beddoe")
 Harold Gordon as Andrew Marschallk
 Gordon Nelson as Dr. Maddox
 Jay Novello as Judge Crain 
 Nick Dennis as Nez Coupe
 Sarah Selby as Mrs. Bowie

Original novel
Paul Wellman's novel was published in 1951. The Los Angeles Times called it "a rattling good story". The New York Times called it "an excellent quasi fictional biography from that skein of tangled legend and fact."

The book became a best seller. Warner Bros bought the film rights and Errol Flynn was mentioned as a possible star. However Alan Ladd had also signed a contract with Warners; he read a copy of the novel and wanted to do it.

Production
Henry Blanke was the producer and James Webb was assigned to do the screenplay.

During filming a fire swept through the Warner Bros lot but the unit for Iron Mistress was on location at the time.

Alan Ladd injured his knee during the shoot and broke his hand on the last day of filming.

Gordon Douglas later said he "loved" filming the scene where Ladd duels in a darkened room.  "There were other things in the picture that were nice", he added. "I always liked Virginia Mayo, she was a wonderful gal."

See also
List of American films of 1952
Sturdivant Gang led by Roswell "Bloody Jack" Sturdivant

References

External links
 
 
 
 

1952 films
1950s biographical drama films
1950s historical drama films
American biographical drama films
American historical drama films
American Western (genre) films
1952 Western (genre) films
Films based on American novels
Films directed by Gordon Douglas
Films scored by Max Steiner
Films set in the 1820s
Warner Bros. films
1952 drama films
1950s English-language films
1950s American films
Cultural depictions of James Bowie